Gods of Honour is a Hong Kong television series adapted from the 16th-century novel Fengshen Bang (also known as Investiture of the Gods or Creation of the Gods), a Chinese vernacular classic written by Xu Zhonglin and Lu Xixing. The series was first aired on TVB Jade in Hong Kong in 2001. It starred Benny Chan, Chin Kar-lok, Irene Wan, Michelle Ye, Dickson Lee, Yuen Wah, Kingdom Yuen and Winnie Yeung in the lead roles.

Story
Since time immemorial, the history of China has seen many belligerent and licentious tyrants. King Zhou of the Shang dynasty was one of the most notorious tyrant. His tyranny triggered off an epic legend: King Wu of the Zhou dynasty overthrowing King Zhou of the Shang dynasty. In the fierce battle between good and evil, ancient China was gripped by paroxysms of rage and grief. Countless loyal and valiant warriors were sacrificed. Taking pity on the aggrieved mortals, the Celestial Realm laid the Rostrum of Gods of Honour.

The story tells a great number of filial piety as well. Important figures such as Nezha and Daji are mentioned.

Cast

 Benny Chan as Na-tsa
 Chin Kar-lok as Yeung Jin
 Irene Wan as So Dan-kei
 Maggie Wong as young So Dan-kei
 Michelle Ye as Yeung Lin-fa
 Dickson Lee as Lui-tsan-tsi
 Yuen Wah as Lei Ching
 Kingdom Yuen as Yan Sap-neung
 Winnie Yeung as Wong Ngan
 Angela Tong as Lau Pei-pa
 Chang Tse-sheng as King Tsau of Sheung
 Fiona Yuen as So Tsing-heung
 Law Lok-lam as Kei Cheung
 Marco Lo as Pak-yap Hau
 Deno Cheung as Kei Fat
 Yu Tze-ming as Keung Tsi-nga
 Lee Kwok-lun as San Kung-pau
 Wong Wai as So Wu
 Rain Lau as Tang Sin-yuk
 Wai Ka-hung as To-hang-suen
 Henry Lo as Pei Kon
 Ngo Ka-nin as Muk-tsa
 Tang Siu-chun as Kam-tsa
 Wong Wai-leung as Tang Kau-kung
 Law Lan as Yiu Tin-heung
 Lam Kei-yan as Lei Ngai-seung
 Kwan Ching as Mo Lai-ching
 Tang Yu-chiu as Mo Lai-hoi
 Cheng Ka-sang as Mo Lai-hong
 Chan Tik-hak as Mo Lai-shau
 Savio Tsang as Wong Fei-fu
 Chan On-ying as Tsui Yu-yuk
 Tam Kuen-fai as Wong Tin-fa
 Chan Min-leung as Hong Pak
 Tam Yat-ching as Tai-yut
 Choi Kwok-hing as Man Chung
 Kwok Tak-shun as Chiu Kung-ming
 Wong Tin-dok as Mui Pak
 Joe Junior as Chong Kung-kung
 Lau Sam-yee as Ko Chun-chung
 Fung Hiu-man as Nine-tailed Fox Spirit
 Chu Kin-kwan as Keung Wan
 Yau Piu as Yin Jiao
 Cheung Hak as Yan Hung
 Sherming Yiu as Concubine Yeung
 Tavia Yeung as Concubine Chan
 Fu Chor-wai as Concubine Lei
 Tsang Wai-wan as Chun-mui
 Tsang Sau-ming as Yim-lo
 Lee Hung-kit as Judge
 Wong Wai-tak as Chin-lei-ngan
 Leung Kin-ping as Shun-fung-yee
 Yu Muk-lin as Fung Po-po
 Che Pou-lor as Lui Sun
 Man Kit-wan as Tin Mo
 Wah Chung-nam as Chek Geok Tai Sin
 Yi Fan-wai as General Hung
 Yau Mang-shing as General Ha
 Cheung Ying-choi as Yeung Chun
 Lau Kwai-fong as Mrs Yeung
 Sun Kwai-hing as Teacher
 Kiu Hung as Host
 Siu Cheuk-yiu as Physician
 Ling Hon as Housekeeper

See also
 The Legend and the Hero
 The Legend and the Hero 2

External links
  Gods of Honour page on TVB's website

TVB dramas
2001 Hong Kong television series debuts
2001 Hong Kong television series endings
Television shows based on Investiture of the Gods